The following is a list of releases by Merge Records. Merge Records was established in 1989 and released its first album (Tossing Seeds: Singles 1989–91, MRG020) in 1992. By 2012, the label had released more than 450 releases.

Each item in the list includes the artist, the release name, the release medium or media, and (in most cases) the release date.

1989–2000
MRG001 – Bricks – Winterspring – Cassette – 1989
MRG002 – Wwax – Live / Left – Cassette – 1989
MRG003 – Metal Pitcher – A Careful Workman Is The Best Safety Device – 7” – 1989
MRG004 – Superchunk – What Do I b/w My Noise and The Train From Kansas City – 7” – 1989
MRG005 – Bricks – Girl With The Carrot Skin b/w The Mountain Goes To Mohammed and The Sturgeon – 7” – 1989
MRG006 – Angels of Epistemology – Angels of Epistemology – 7” – 1990
MRG007 – Superchunk – Slack Motherfucker b/w Night Creatures – 7” – 1990
MRG008 – Wwax – Like It Or Not – Double 7” – August, 1990
MRG009 – Erectus Monotone – Vertigogo b/w En Este Momente and Bakin' Bread – 7” – October, 1990
MRG010 – Breadwinner – 232 S. Laurel St. – 7” – November, 1990
MRG012 – Finger – Everywhere b/w Awful Truth – 7” – November, 1990
MRG013 – Pure – Ballard – 7” – April, 1991
MRG014 – Superchunk – Cool b/w Fishing – 7” – February, 1991
MRG015 – Coral – Filling A Hole b/w Your Reward and Snow – 7” – May, 1991
MRG016 – Erectus Monotone – Cathode Gumshoe – 7” – May, 1991
MRG017 – Breadwinner – ‘‘ ‘‘ b/w Prescott and Mac's Oranges – 7” – August, 1991
MRG018 – Superchunk – The Freed Seed – 7” – August, 1991
MRG019 – Seam – Granny 9X b/w Look Back In Anger – 7” – March, 1992
MRG020 – Superchunk – Tossing Seeds: Singles 1989–91 – CD/LP/Cassette – April 1, 1992
MRG021 – Polvo / Erectus Monotone – El Cid – Split 7” – March, 1992
MRG022 – Polvo – Cor-Crane Secret – CD/LP/Cassette – July 13, 1992
MRG023 – Drive Like Jehu – Bullet Train To Vegas b/w Hand Over Fist – 7” – April, 1992
MRG024 – Fuckers – Quick Cash b/w Coming Home – 7” – April, 1992
MRG025 – Bricks – The Getting Wet Part – 7” – July, 1992
MRG026 – Honor Role – Purgatory b/w Jank – 7” – August, 1992
MRG027 – Superchunk – Mower b/w On The Mouth – 7”/CD single – October 19, 1992
MRG028 – Erectus Monotone – Glider b/w Soul Taker – 7” – October, 1992
MRG029 – Butterglory – Alexander Bends + 4 – 7” – October, 1992
MRG030 – Bricks – A Microphone And A Box Of Dirt – CD/Cassette – November 16, 1992
MRG031 – Angels of Epistemology – Fruit – CD/Cassette – November 16, 1992
MRG033 – Alf Danielson – Mary Had A Steamboat b/w Glover – 7” – October, 1992
MRG034 – Superchunk – The Question Is How Fast b/w Forged It & 100,00 Fireflies – 7”/CD Single – January 11, 1993
MRG035 – Rocket From the Crypt – Pigeon Eater b/w (The) Paste That You Love – 7” – March, 1993
MRG036 – The Renderers – A Million Lights b/w Primitive Country – 7” – February, 1993
MRG037 – Pipe – Ashtray b/w Warsaw – 7” – March, 1993
MRG038 – Polvo – Tilebreaker b/w The Chameleon & Tiara Fetish – 7” – February, 1993
MRG039 – The 6ths – Heaven In A Black Leather Jacket b/w Rot In The Sun – 7” – March, 1993
MRG040 – Polvo – Today's Active Lifestyles – CD/LP/Cassette – April 19, 1993
MRG041 – Honor Role – Album – CD – April 1, 1997
MRG042 – The Meanies – Rhyming Logic b/w Operator and Darkside Of My Mind – 7” – August, 1993
MRG043 – The 3Ds – Beautiful Things b/w Summer Stone – 7” – July, 1993
MRG044 – Erectus Monotone – Close Up – CDEP/12”/Cassette – August 16, 1993
MRG045 – Coral – Boxtruck b/w Half The Time – 7”October, 1993
MRG046 – Butterglory – Our Heads – 7” – October, 1993
MRG047 – Superchunk – Ribbon b/w Who Needs Light – 7” – February, 1994
MRG048 – Lambchop – Nine b/w Moody Fucker – 7” – February, 1994
MRG049 – Rocket From the Crypt – UFO, UFO, UFO b/w Birdman – 7” – April, 1994
MRG050 – Superchunk – Precision Auto Part 2 b/w Precision Auto Part 3 – 7” – April, 1994
MRG051 – Portastatic – I Hope Your Heart Is Not Brittle – CD/LP/Cassette – February 14, 1994
MRG052 – Breadwinner – Burner – CDEP/Cassette – March 14, 1994
MRG52.5 – Breadwinner – Supplementary Cig – 7” – March, 1994
MRG053 – Archers of Loaf – What Did You Expect? b/w Ethel Merman – 7” – January, 1994
MRG054 – Pipe – Human Gutterball b/w Figure 8 – 7” – January, 1994
MRG055 – The Magnetic Fields – The Charm of the Highway Strip – CD/Cassette – April 18, 1994 / LP – May 6, 2008
MRG056 – Polvo – Celebrate the New Dark Age – CDEP/Cassette/Triple 7” – May 2, 1994 / 12-inch – November 4, 2008
MRG057 – Squirrel Nut Zippers – Roasted Right – 7”/CDEP – May, 1994
MRG058 – The Bats – Live at WFMU – 7” – May, 1994
MRG059 – Superchunk – The First Part – 7”/CD Single – March 14, 1994
MRG060 – Superchunk – Foolish – CD/LP/Cassette – April 18, 1994 / CD/LP remastered reissue - September 13, 2011
MRG061 – Velocity Girl – Your Silent Face b/w You're So Good to Me – 7” – May, 1994
MRG062 – Labradford – Julius b/w Columna de la Independencia – 7” – July 25, 1994
MRG063 – Odes – Meltaway b/w Honey Gets Hard – 7” – June 20, 1994
MRG064 – The 3Ds – Hey Seuss b/w River Burial – 7” – March, 1994
MRG065 – The 3Ds – The Venus Trail – CD/Cassette – May 2, 1994
MRG066 – Lambchop – Soaky in the Pooper b/w Two Kittens Don't Make a Puppy – 7” – July 25, 1994
MRG067 – Various Artists – Rows of Teeth – CD/Cassette – July 25, 1994
MRG068 – Cornershop – Born Disco, Died Heavy Metal + 3 – 7” – November 15, 1994
MRG069 – Superchunk – Driveway to Driveway – 7”/CDEP – October 24, 1994
MRG070 – Lambchop – I Hope You're Sitting Down aka Jack's Tulips – CD/Cassette – September 19, 1994
MRG071 – Butterglory – Crumble – CD/LP/Cassette – October 3, 1994
MRG072 – The Mad Scene – The Greatest Time EP – 7” – October, 1994
MRG073 – The Magnetic Fields – All The Umbrellas in London b/w Rats In The Garbage Of The Western World – 7” – October, 1994
MRG074 – Cornershop – Hold on It Hurts – CD/Cassette – January 23, 1995
MRG075 – The Magnetic Fields – The Wayward Bus / Distant Plastic Trees – CD/Cassette – January 23, 1995
MRG076 – East River Pipe – Bring On The Loser – 7” – March, 1995
MRG077 – The Mad Scene – Sealight – CD – May 8, 1995
MRG078 – Spent – Songs of Drinking and Rebellion – CD/LP/Cassette – March 6, 1995
MRG079 – Cakekitchen – Stompin' Thru the Boneyard – CD/Cassette – March 6, 1995
MRG080 – Portastatic – Scrapbook – CDEP/Double 7” – March 6, 1995
MRG081 – East River Pipe – Poor Fricky – CD/LP – May 8, 1995
MRG082 – Guv'ner – Knight Moves – CDEP/Double 7” – June 19, 1995
MRG083 – Bio Ritmo – Piraguero b/w Asia Minor – 7” – August 29, 1995
MRG084 – Butterglory – Wait for Me – Double 7” – June 19, 1995
MRG085 – Superchunk – Incidental Music 1991–95 – CD/Double LP/Cassette – June 20, 1995
MRG086 – Portastatic – Slow Note from a Sinking Ship – CD/LP – June 20, 1995
MRG087 – Butterglory – Downed: A Singles Compilation – CD – July 25, 1995
MRG088 – Verbena – I Say So b/w Silver Queen – 7” – June 20, 1995
MRG089 – Superchunk – Hyper Enough – 7”/CD Single – August 29, 1995
MRG090 – Superchunk – Here's Where the Strings Come In – CD/LP/Cassette – September 19, 1995 / CD/LP remastered reissue - April 16, 2011
MRG091 – The Magnetic Fields – Get Lost – CD – September 19, 1995 / LP – November 4, 2008
MRG092 – The Wedding Present – Sucker b/w Waiting on the Guns – 7” – October 24, 1995
MRG093 – The Karl Hendricks Trio – What Everyone Else Calls Fun b/w A Boy Who Plays With Dolls – 7” – October 24, 1995
MRG094 – The Karl Hendricks Trio – Some Girls Like Cigarettes – CDEP – September 19, 1995
MRG095 – Polvo – This Eclipse – CDEP – November 14, 1995
MRG096 – Verbena – Everyday Shoes + 2 – 7” – October 24, 1995
MRG097 – Lambchop – How I Quit Smoking – CD/Double LP – January 30, 1996
MRG098 – Butterglory – Are You Building a Temple In Heaven? – CD/LP – February 20, 1996
MRG099 – Odes – Me and My Big Mouth – CDEP – February 20, 1996
MRG100 – Various Artists – Merge 100 – CDEP – April 22, 1997
MRG101 – Cakekitchen – Bald Old Bear – CDEP – January 30, 1996
MRG102 – Verbena – Pilot Park – CDEP – January 30, 1996
MRG103 – Neutral Milk Hotel – On Avery Island – CD/LP – March 26, 1996
MRG104 – Butterglory – She's Got the Akshun! – CD Single – January 30, 1996
MRG105 – Spent – Revenging b/w Foreign Like a Car – 7” – March 26, 1996
MRG106 – The Mad Scene – Chinese Honey – CDEP – March 26, 1996
MRG107 – The Karl Hendricks Trio – For a While, It Was Funny – CD/LP – May 21, 1996
MRG108 – Lambchop – Hank – CDEP/10” – July 9, 1996
MRG109 – Guv'ner – The Hunt – CD/LP – August 20, 1996
MRG110 – East River Pipe – Kill the Action – CD Single – July 30, 1996
MRG111 – East River Pipe – Mel – CD/LP – September 10, 1996
MRG112 – Guv'ner – Break a Promise – CD Single – July 30, 1996
MRG113 – Cakekitchen – The Devil and the Deep Blue Sea – CD – October 1, 1996
MRG114 – Spent – A Seat Beneath the Chairs – CD/Double LP – October 1, 1997
MRG115 – Verbena – Souls for Sale – CD/LP – April 1, 1997
MRG116 – Spent – Umbrella Wars – CD Single – September 10, 1996
MRG117 – Portastatic – Spying on the Spies b/w Do You Want To Buy A Bridge? – 7” – November 1, 1996
MRG118 – Superchunk – The Laughter Guns – CDEP – October 22, 1996
MRG119 – The Third Eye Foundation – Ghost – CD/LP – April 22, 1997
MRG120 – Portastatic – The Nature of Sap – CD/LP – March 11, 1997
MRG121 – The Ladybug Transistor – Beverley Atonale – CD/LP – February 11, 1997
MRG122 – Beatnik Filmstars – Off-White Noize – 7” – May 27, 1997
MRG123 – Pipe – Slowboy – CD/LP – July 8, 1997
MRG124 – Lambchop – Cigaretiquette b/w Mr. Crabby – 7” – May 27, 1997
MRG125 – Beatnik Filmstars – Inhospitalable – CD – September 9, 1997
MRG126 – Lambchop – Whitey b/w Playboy, The Shit – 7” – July 8, 1997
MRG127 – The Gothic Archies – The New Despair – CDEP – November 4, 1997
MRG128 – Superchunk – Watery Hands 7”/CD Single – July 8, 1997
MRG129 – Superchunk – Indoor Living – CD/LP – September 9, 1997 / CD/LP remastered reissue - February 25, 2014
MRG130 – Lambchop – Thriller – CD – September 23, 1997
MRG131 – Shark Quest – Blontzo’s Revenge b/w Pig River Minor – 7” – October 14, 1997
MRG132 – The Rock*A*Teens – Turn On The Waterworks – 7” – October 14, 1997
MRG133 – Butterglory – Rat Tat Tat – CD/LP – October 14, 1997
MRG134 – The Third Eye Foundation – The Sound Of Violence – CDEP – November 25, 1997
MRG135 – The Karl Hendricks Trio – The Worst Coffee I’ve Ever Had Part II b/w Out On The Weekend – 7” – November 25, 1997
MRG136 – Neutral Milk Hotel – In the Aeroplane Over the Sea – CD/LP – February 20, 1998
MRG137 – The Karl Hendricks Trio – Declare Your Weapons – CD/LP – February 20, 1998
MRG138 – Dynamic Truths – You Take It All b/w Exit Screaming – 7” – April 21, 1998
MRG139 – Shark Quest – Battle of the Loons – CD – March 10, 1998
MRG140 – The Rock*A*Teens – Baby, A Little Rain Must Fall – CD – April 21, 1998
MRG141 – The Ladybug Transistor – Today Knows b/w Massachusetts – 7” – April 21, 1998
MRG142 – Guv'ner – Spectral Worship – CD – August 11, 1998
MRG143 – The Magnetic Fields – I Don’t Believe You b/w When I’m Not Looking, You’re Not There – 7” – July 21, 1998
MRG144 – Pram – The North Pole Radio Station – CD – July 21, 1998
MRG145 – Beatnik Filmstars – Boss Disque – CD – August 11, 1998
MRG146 – Lambchop – What Another Man Spills – CD – September 8, 1998
MRG147 – Ganger – Hammock Style – CD – September 29, 1998
MRG148 – Superchunk – The Majestic b/w Reg – 7” – February 9, 1999
MRG149 – The Third Eye Foundation- You Guys Kill Me – CD/LP – October 20, 1998
MRG150 – Seaweed – Actions and Indications – CD/LP – January 12, 1999
MRG151 – The Magnetic Fields – Holiday – CD – January 12, 1999 / LP – October 24, 2011
MRG152 – The Magnetic Fields – The House of Tomorrow – CDEP – January 12, 1999
MRG153 – Ashley Stove – New Scars – CD – February 9, 1999
MRG154 – The Ladybug Transistor – The Albemarle Sound – CD/LP – March 23, 1999
MRG155 – The Rock*A*Teens – Golden Time – CD – March 23, 1999
MRG156 – Versus – Afterglow – CDEP – February 16, 1999
MRG157 – Spaceheads – Angel Station – CD – March 23, 1999
MRG158 – The Music Tapes – First Imaginary Symphony for Nomad – CD/LP – July 6, 1999
MRG159 – Superchunk – Hello Hawk – CDEP – July 6, 1999
MRG160 – The Spinanes – Imp Years – CDEP – April 4, 2000
MRG161 – Various Artists – Oh, Merge: A Merge 10 Year Anniversary Compilation – CD – July 6, 1999
MRG162 – Superchunk – Superchunk (reissue) – CD – August 10, 1999
MRG163 – Superchunk – Come Pick Me Up – CD/LP – August 10, 1999
MRG164 – East River Pipe – The Gasoline Age – CD – August 10, 1999
MRG165 – Superchunk – No Pocky for Kitty (reissue) – CD – August 10, 1999 / CD/LP remastered reissue - August 17, 2010
MRG166 – The Magnetic Fields – 69 Love Songs vol. 1 – CD – June 8, 1999
MRG167 – The Magnetic Fields – 69 Love Songs vol. 2 – CD – June 8, 1999
MRG168 – The Magnetic Fields – 69 Love Songs vol. 3 – CD – June 8, 1999
MRG169 – The Magnetic Fields – 69 Love Songs – Triple CD Box Set – June 8, 1999 / 6×10″ box set – April 17, 2010
MRG170 – Superchunk – On The Mouth (reissue) – CD – August 10, 1999 / CD/LP remastered reissue - August 17, 2010
MRG171 – ...And You Will Know Us By the Trail Of Dead – Madonna – CD/LP – October 19, 1999
MRG172 – Ganger – Canopy – CDEP – September 14, 1999

Since 2000
MRG160 (listed above) was released in 2000
MRG173 – Superchunk – 1,000 Pounds – CD Single – February 8, 2000
MRG174 – The Third Eye Foundation – Little Lost Soul – CD – February 8, 2000
MRG175 – Lambchop – Nixon – CD – February 8, 2000 / Double CD/LP remastered reissue - January 28, 2014
MRG176 – Versus – Shangri-La – CD Single – April 25, 2000
MRG177 – Matt Suggs – Golden Days Before They End – CD – June 6, 2000
MRG178 – Future Bible Heroes – I'm Lonely (And I Love It) – CDEP – July 18, 2000
MRG179 – Shark Quest – Man on Stilts – CD – August 8, 2000
MRG180 – Portastatic – De Mel, De Melão – CDEP – May 9, 2000
MRG181 – The Rock*A*Teens – Sweet Bird of Youth – CD – October 3, 2000
MRG182 – Paul Burch and the WPA Ballclub – Blue Notes – CD – August 8, 2000
MRG183 – Spaceheads – Low Pressure – CD – June 4, 2002
MRG184 – Pram – The Museum of Imaginary Animals – CD – September 5, 2000
MRG185 – The 6ths – Hyacinths and Thistles – CD – September 5, 2000
MRG186 – Versus – Hurrah – CD – October 3, 2000
MRG187 – The Clientele – Suburban Light – CD – April 24, 2001
MRG188 – The Clean – Getaway – CD – August 21, 2001
MRG189 – The Ladybug Transistor – Argyle Heir – CD/LP – May 22, 2001
MRG190 – Portastatic – Looking For Leonard soundtrack – CD – May 22, 2001
MRG191 – Spoon- Loveways – CDEP – October 17, 2000
MRG192 – Ashley Stove – All Summer Long – CD – March 23, 2001
MRG193 – Annie Hayden – The Rub – CD – February 20, 2001
MRG194 – Pram – Somniloquy – CDEP – August 21, 2001
MRG195 – Spoon – Girls Can Tell – CD/LP – February 20, 2001 / LP reissue – May 6, 2008
MRG196 – Paul Burch – Last of My Kind – CD – April 24, 2001
MRG197 – David Kilgour – A Feather in the Engine – CD – January 22, 2002
MRG198 – Superchunk – Late Century Dream – CD Single – August 21, 2001
MRG199 – The Third Eye Foundation – I Poo Poo on Your JuJu – CD – May 22, 2001
MRG200 – Lambchop- Tools in the Dryer – CD – September 18, 2001
MRG201 – Superchunk – Here's to Shutting Up – CD/LP – September 18, 2001
MRG202 – The Clientele – A Fading Summer – CDEP – October 23, 2001
MRG203 – East River Pipe – Shining Hours In A Can – CD – March 19, 2002
MRG204 – Lambchop – Is A Woman – CD – February 19, 2002
MRG205 – Stephin Merritt – Eban And Charley soundtrack – CD – January 22, 2002
MRG206 – Imperial Teen – On – CD/LP – April 9, 2002
MRG207 – Superchunk – Art Class – CD5 – April 9, 2002
MRG208 – Crooked Fingers – Reservoir Songs – CDEP – May 7, 2002
MRG209 – Radar Brothers – And the Surrounding Mountains – CD – May 7, 2002
MRG210 – Portastatic featuring Ken Vandermark and Tim Mulvenna – The Perfect Little Door – CDEP – October 23, 2001
MRG211 – Spoon – A Series of Sneaks – CD reissue – June 4, 2002 / LP reissue – May 6, 2008
MRG212 – Eric Bachmann – Short Careers: Music From the Film Ball of Wax soundtrack – CD – August 20, 2002
MRG213 – Spoon – Someone Something + 2 – 7” – July 23, 2002
MRG214 – The Clientele – Haunted Melody b/w Fear of Falling – 7” – November 5, 2002
MRG215 – Spoon – Kill the Moonlight – CD/LP – August 20, 2002 / LP reissue – August 3, 2010
MRG216 – Various Artists – Survive and Advance, Vol. 1 – CD – July 23, 2002
MRG217 – The Clientele – The Violet Hour – CD – July 8, 2003
MRG218 – Destroyer – This Night – CD – October 8, 2002 / Double LP – April 20, 2013
MRG219 – Various Artists – Survive and Advance, Vol. 2 – CD – February 18, 2003
MRG220 – The Clean – Anthology – Double CD – January 21, 2003
MRG221 – Superchunk – Cup of Sand – Double CD – August 19, 2003
MRG222 – Crooked Fingers – Red Devil Dawn – CD – January 21, 2003
MRG223 – M. Ward – Transfiguration of Vincent – CD – March 18, 2003
MRG224 – Pram – Dark Island – CD – February 18, 2003
MRG225 – Portastatic – Summer of the Shark – CD – April 8, 2003
MRG226 – Matt Suggs – Amigo Row – CD – August 19, 2003
MRG227 – Buzzcocks – Buzzcocks – CD – March 18, 2003
MRG228 – The Essex Green – The Long Goodbye – CD – April 8, 2003
MRG229 – The Ladybug Transistor – The Ladybug Transistor – CD – October 7, 2003
MRG230 – Superchunk – Crowding Up Your Visual Field – DVD – January 20, 2004
MRG231 – Various Artists – Survive and Advance, Vol. 3 – CD – July 29, 2003
MRG232 – Matt Elliott – The Mess We Made – CD – May 6, 2003
MRG233 – David Kilgour – Frozen Orange – CD – August 24, 2004
MRG234 – East River Pipe – Garbageheads on Endless Stun – CD – September 9, 2003
MRG235 – The Rosebuds – The Rosebuds Make Out – CD – October 7, 2003
MRG236 – Portastatic – Autumn Was a Lark – CDEP – October 7, 2003
MRG237 – The Karl Hendricks Trio – The Jerk Wins Again – CD – July 29, 2003
MRG238 – Destroyer – Your Blues – CD – March 9, 2004
MRG239 – Camera Obscura – Underachievers Please Try Harder – CD – January 20, 2004 / LP – November 4, 2008
MRG240 – Lambchop – Aw Cmon – CD – February 17, 2004
MRG241 – Lambchop – No You Cmon – CD – February 17, 2004
MRG242 – Shark Quest – Gods And Devils – CD – August 24, 2004
MRG243 – Dinosaur – Dinosaur (reissue) – CD – March 22, 2005
MRG244 – Dinosaur Jr – You're Living All Over Me (reissue) – CD – March 22, 2005
MRG245 – Dinosaur Jr – Bug (reissue) – CD – March 22, 2005
MRG246 – Dinosaur Jr – Chocomel Daze (Live 1987) – LP – November 19, 2012
MRG248 – Crooked Fingers – Dignity and Shame – CD/Double LP – February 22, 2005
MRG249 – Richard Buckner – Dents And Shells – CD – October 12, 2004
MRG250 – Various Artists – Old Enough To Know Better: 15 Years of Merge Records – Triple CD – July 13, 2004
MRG251 – Radar Brothers – Fallen Leaf Pages – CD – March 22, 2005
MRG252 – American Music Club – Love Songs for Patriots – CD – October 12, 2004
MRG253 – Arcade Fire/Alvino Rey Orchestra – Neighborhood #1 (Tunnels) b/w My Buddy – 7” – June 8, 2004
MRG254 – Lou Barlow – Emoh – CD – January 25, 2005
MRG255 – Arcade Fire – Funeral – CD/LP – September 14, 2004
MRG256 – Camera Obscura – Biggest Bluest Hi Fi (reissue) – CD – October 12, 2004
MRG257 – Lambchop & Hands Off Cuba – CoLAB – CDEP – October 11, 2005
MRG258 – Destroyer – Notorious Lightning & Other Works – CDEP – January 25, 2005
MRG259 – The Rosebuds – The Rosebuds Unwind – CDEP – April 12, 2005
MRG260 – M. Ward – Transistor Radio – CD/LP – February 22, 2005
MRG261 – Tenement Halls – Knitting Needles and Bicycle Bells – CD – August 23, 2005
MRG262 – Teenage Fanclub – Man-Made – CD – June 7, 2005
MRG263 – Portastatic – Bright Ideas – CD – August 23, 2005
MRG264 – The Rosebuds – Birds Make Good Neighbors – CD – September 13, 2005
MRG265 – Spoon – Gimme Fiction – CD/LP – May 10, 2005
MRG266 – Annie Hayden – The Enemy Of Love – CD – September 13, 2005
MRG267 – The Clientele – Strange Geometry – CD/LP – October 11, 2005
MRG268 – Destroyer – Destroyer's Rubies – CD – January 24, 2006 / Double LP – April 21, 2012
MRG269 – Arcade Fire – Arcade Fire – CDEP – July 12, 2005
MRG270 – Arcade Fire – Miroir Noir – DVD – April 7, 2009
MRG271 – East River Pipe – What Are You On? – CD – January 24, 2006
MRG272 – Robert Pollard – From a Compound Eye – CD/Double LP – January 24, 2006
MRG273 – Spoon – Sister Jack – CD Single – November 8, 2005
MRG274 – Lambchop – The Decline of Country & Western Civilization Part II: The Woodwind Years – CD – April 11, 2006
MRG275 – Arcade Fire – Cold Wind – 7” – August 9, 2005
MRG276 – Camera Obscura – Let's Get Out of This Country – CD/LP – June 6, 2006
MRG277 – Portastatic – Who Loves the Sun soundtrack – CD – June 6, 2006
MRG278 – The Essex Green – Cannibal Sea – CD – February 21, 2006
MRG279 – Richard Buckner – Meadow – CD – September 12, 2006
MRG280 – M. Ward – Post-War – CD/LP – August 22, 2006
MRG281 – White Whale – WWI – CD – July 25, 2006
MRG282 – Robert Pollard – Normal Happiness – CD/LP – October 10, 2006
MRG283 – Portastatic – Be Still Please – CD – October 10, 2006
MRG284 – Lambchop – Damaged – CD/LP – August 22, 2006
MRG285 – Arcade Fire – Neon Bible – CD – March 6, 2007 / Double LP – May 8, 2007
MRG286 – Camera Obscura – Lloyd, I'm Ready to Be Heartbroken – CD Single – May 9, 2006
MRG287 – David Kilgour – The Far Now – CD – January 23, 2007
MRG288 – M. Ward – To Go Home – CDEP – February 20, 2007
MRG289 – The Broken West – I Can't Go On, I'll Go On – CD – January 23, 2007
MRG290 – Spoon – Telephono / Soft Effects (reissue) – Double CD – July 25, 2006
MRG291 – The Ladybug Transistor – Here Comes the Rain – Digital EP – October 31, 2006
MRG292 – The Ladybug Transistor – Can't Wait Another Day – CD – June 6, 2007
MRG293 – Portastatic – Sour Shores – Digital EP – September 12, 2006
MRG294 – The Rosebuds – Night of the Furies – CD – April 10, 2007
MRG295 – Spoon – Ga Ga Ga Ga Ga – CD/LP – July 10, 2007
MRG296 – Camera Obscura – If Looks Could Kill – CD Single – January 23, 2007
MRG297 – The Clientele – God Save The Clientele – CD/LP – May 8, 2007
MRG298 – M. Ward – "Early Morning Rain" – digital single – April 10, 2007
MRG299 – David Kilgour – The Before Now: A David Kilgour Retrospective – Digital Album – January 9, 2007
MRG300 – Arcade Fire – Neon Bible – Deluxe CD – March 6, 2007
MRG301 – M. Ward – Duet For Guitars #2 (reissue) – CD – July 10, 2007
MRG302 – Superchunk – Misfits and Mistakes – 7” – June 5, 2007 (Re-release as autographed picture disc on April 17, 2010)
MRG303 – Big Dipper – Supercluster: The Big Dipper Anthology – Triple CD – March 18, 2008
MRG304 – Arcade Fire – Keep the Car Running b/w Broken Window  – 7” – May 8, 2007
MRG305 – Oakley Hall – I'll Follow You – CD/LP – September 11, 2007
MRG306 – Imperial Teen – The Hair the TV the Baby & the Band – CD – August 21, 2007
MRG307 – Robert Pollard – Coast to Coast Carpet of Love – CD/LP – October 9, 2007
MRG308 – Caribou – Andorra – CD/LP – August 21, 2007
MRG309 – American Music Club – The Golden Age – CD – February 19, 2008
MRG310 – Shout Out Louds – Our Ill Wills – CD/LP – September 11, 2007
MRG311 – Shout Out Louds – Tonight I Have to Leave It – CDEP – June 5, 2007
MRG312 – Caribou – Melody Day – CD Single – July 10, 2007
MRG313 – Arcade Fire / LCD Soundsystem – Poupée De Cire, Poupée De Son b/w No Love Lost – Split 7” – September, 2007
MRG314 – Arcade Fire / Calexico – Intervention b/w Ocean of Noise – Split 7” – July 10, 2007
MRG315 – Radar Bros – Auditorium – CD – January 29, 2008
MRG316 – Arcade Fire – No Cars Go b/w Surf City Eastern Bloc  – 7” – September 11, 2007
MRG317 – Robert Pollard – Standard Gargoyle Decisions – CD/LP – October 9, 2007
MRG318 – The Clientele – Bookshop Casanova – Digital Single – August 28, 2007
MRG319 – Destroyer – Trouble in Dreams – CD/Double LP – March 18, 2008
MRG320 – Spoon – Don't You Evah – CDEP – April 8, 2008
MRG321 – Wye Oak – If Children – CD – April 8, 2008
MRG322 – The Ladybug Transistor – Always On The Saxophone – Digital Single – October 9, 2007
MRG323 – M. Ward – Hold Time – CD/LP – February 17, 2009
MRG324 – She & Him – Volume One – CD/LP – March 18, 2008
MRG325 – The Clean – Mister Pop – CD – September 8, 2009
MRG326 – Destroyer – Bay of Pigs b/w Ravers – 12-inch Single – August 18, 2009
MRG327 – Caribou – She's The One – Digital Single – August 21, 2007
MRG328 – The Rosebuds – Sweet Beats, Troubled Sleep (Night of the Furies Remixed) – Digital Album – April 10, 2008
MRG329 – The Broken West – Now or Heaven – CD – September 9, 2008
MRG330 – Julian Koster – The Singing Saw at Christmastime – CD/LP – October 7, 2008
MRG331 – Shout Out Louds – Impossible – CD Single – April 8, 2008
MRG332 – Lou Barlow – Goodnight Unknown – CD – October 6, 2009
MRG333 – Portastatic – Some Small History – Double CD – September 9, 2008
MRG334 – The Rosebuds – Life Like – CD/LP – October 7, 2008
MRG335 – Lambchop – Ohio – CD – October 7, 2008
MRG336 – Volcano Suns – The Bright Orange Years (reissue) – CD – January 27, 2009
MRG337 – Volcano Suns – All-Night Lotus Party (reissue) – CD – January 27, 2009
MRG338 – The Music Tapes – Music Tapes for Clouds and Tornadoes – CD/LP – August 19, 2008
MRG339 – Richard Buckner – Our Blood – CD/LP – August 2, 2011
MRG340 – Conor Oberst – Conor Oberst – CD/LP – August 5, 2008
MRG341 – Conor Oberst – Gentleman's Pact – EP – May 5, 2009
MRG342 – East River Pipe – We Live in Rented Rooms – CD – February 15, 2011
MRG343 – Arcade Fire – Miroir Noir – Deluxe DVD – April 7, 2009
MRG344 – Telekinesis – Telekinesis! – CD – April 7, 2009 / LP reissue – August 20, 2013
MRG345 – Spoon – Got Nuffin – CDEP/12" EP – June 30, 2009
MRG346 – Wye Oak – The Knot – CD – July 21, 2009 / LP – October 24, 2011
MRG347 – The Clientele – Bonfires on the Heath – CD/LP – October 6, 2009
MRG348 – Caribou – Swim – CD/LP – April 20, 2009
MRG349 – Conor Oberst and the Mystic Valley Band – Outer South – CD/Double LP – May 5, 2009
MRG350 – Various Artists – SCORE! – Box Set – 2009
MRG351 – Various Artists – SCORE! 20 Years of Merge Records: The Covers! – CD – April 7, 2009
MRG352 – Various Artists – SCORE! 20 Years of Merge Records: The Remixes! – CD – November 17, 2009
MRG354 – She & Him – Volume Two – CD/LP – March 23, 2010
MRG355 – Richard Buckner – Bloomed (reissue) – Digital Album – March, 2009 / Double CD/LP remastered reissue - March 18, 2014
MRG356 – Richard Buckner – The Hill (reissue) – Digital Album – March 3, 2009
MRG357 – Richard Buckner – Impasse (reissue) – Digital Album – March 3, 2009
MRG358 – Superchunk – Leaves In The Gutter – CDEP – April 7, 2009
MRG359 – Superchunk – Crossed Wires b/w Blinders – 7-inch – July 7, 2009
MRG360 – Polvo – In Prism – CD/Double LP – September 8, 2009
MRG363 – Radar Bros. – The Illustrated Garden – CD – March 23, 2010
MRG364 – She & Him – In the Sun b/w I Can Hear Music  – 7-inch – February 23, 2010
MRG365 – Spoon – Transference – CD/LP – January 19, 2010
MRG366 – The Love Language – Libraries – CD/LP – July 13, 2010
MRG367 – Various Artists – Stroke: Songs for Chris Knox – Double CD – February 23, 2010
MRG368 – The Music Tapes – Mary's Voice – CD/LP – September 4, 2012
MRG369 – Destroyer – Kaputt – CD/Double LP – January 25, 2011
MRG370 – Shout Out Louds – Work – CD – February 23, 2010
MRG371 - Destroyer - City of Daughters (reissue) – CD – March 23, 2010
MRG372 - Destroyer - Thief (reissue) – CD – March 23, 2010
MRG373 - Destroyer - Streethawk: A Seduction (reissue) – CD/LP – March 23, 2010
MRG374 – Let's Wrestle – In the Court of the Wrestling Let's – CD – March 23, 2010
MRG375 – Lambchop – Live at XX Merge – CD – November 17, 2009
MRG376 – Spoon – Written in Reverse b/w Mean Red Spider – 7-inch – January 12, 2010
MRG377 – The Ladybug Transistor – Clutching Stems – CD – June 7, 2011
MRG378 – Versus – On the Ones and Threes – CD/Double LP – August 3, 2010
MRG379 – Tracey Thorn – Love and Its Opposite – CD – May 18, 2010
MRG380 – Superchunk – Majesty Shredding – CD/LP – September 14, 2010
MRG381 – Shout Out Louds – Fall Hard – Digital Single – February 2, 2010
MRG382 – Telekinesis – Dirty Thing b/w Non Toxic and "Drawback – 7-inch – April 17, 2010
MRG383 – Portastatic – Make It Sound In Tune – Digital EP – December 22, 2009
MRG384 – The Rosebuds – Loud Planes Fly Low – CD/LP – June 7, 2011
MRG385 – Arcade Fire - The Suburbs – CD/Double LP – August 2, 2010
MRG386 – Let's Wrestle / The Love Language – Brittany's Back b/w I'm So Lazy – Split 7” – April 17, 2010
MRG388 – Wye Oak – My Neighbor / My Creator - CDEP – March 12, 2010 / 12-inch – November 19, 2012
MRG389 – Tracey Thorn – Oh, the Divorces! b/w Taxi Cab – Digital Single – April 19, 2010
MRG390 – Superchunk – Digging For Something b/w February Punk – 7-inch – July 13, 2010
MRG391 – Fucked Up – Year of the Ox – 12-inch – September 28, 2010
MRG392 – Teenage Fanclub – Shadows – CD – June 8, 2010
MRG393 – Arcade Fire – The Suburbs b/w Ready to Start – 12-inch EP – May 27, 2010
MRG394 – Telekinesis – 12 Desperate Straight Lines – CD/LP – February 15, 2011
MRG395 – Apex Manor – The Year of Magical Drinking – CD – January 25, 2011
MRG396 – Lou Barlow + Missingmen – Too Much Freedom = Sentridoh III – Digital EP – June 7, 2010
MRG397 – The Clientele – Minotaur – CDEP – August 31, 2010
MRG398 – Various Artists – Merge Records 2010 Digital Sampler – Digital Album – May 4, 2010
MRG399 – Tracey Thorn – Why Does the Wind? – Digital EP – June 15, 2010
MRG400 – Wye Oak – Civilian – CD/LP – March 8, 2011
MRG401 – Destroyer – Archer on the Beach b/w Grief Point – 12-inch single – November 2, 2010
MRG402 – Telekinesis – Parallel Seismic Conspiracies – CDEP – October 26, 2010
MRG403 – Let's Wrestle – Getting Rest b/w When I Was in the Hospital – Digital Single – September 7, 2010
MRG404 – She & Him – Thieves b/w I Knew It Would Happen This Way – 7-inch – August 31, 2010
MRG405 – The Mountain Goats – All Eternals Deck – CD/LP – March 29, 2011
MRG406 – The Extra Lens – Undercard – CD/LP – October 19, 2010
MRG407 – She & Him – I Put a Spell On You – Digital Single – December 7, 2010
MRG408 – Caribou – Swim Remixes – 12-inch EP / Digital Album – October 26, 2010
MRG409 – Tracey Thorn – Opposites – Digital EP – August 31, 2010
MRG410 – Polvo – Siberia – CD/LP – September 30, 2013
MRG411 – Wild Flag – Wild Flag – CD/LP – September 13, 2011
MRG412 – Wild Flag – Future Crimes b/w Glass Tambourines – 7-inch – April 16, 2011
MRG413 – Jonny – Jonny – CD – April 12, 2011
MRG414 – Let's Wrestle – Nursing Home – CD/LP – May 17, 2011
MRG415 – Archers of Loaf – Icky Mettle (Remastered) (reissue) – Double-CD/LP – August 2, 2011
MRG416 – Superchunk / Coliseum – Horror Business b/w Bullet – split 7-inch – April 16, 2011
MRG417 – Amor de Días – Street of the Love of Days – CD/LP – May 17, 2011
MRG418 – Times New Viking – Dancer Equired – CD/LP – April 26, 2011
MRG419 – David Kilgour & the Heavy Eights – Left by Soft – CD – April 26, 2011
MRG420 – Arcade Fire – Scenes from the Suburbs – Double-CD and DVD – May 17, 2011
MRG421 – Eleanor Friedberger – Last Summer – CD/LP – July 12, 2011
MRG422 – Tracey Thorn – You Are a Lover – Digital EP – April 25, 2011
MRG423 – Imperial Teen – Feel the Sound – CD/LP – January 31, 2012
MRG424 – She & Him – A Very She & Him Christmas – CD/LP – October 25, 2011
MRG425 – Archers of Loaf – Vee Vee (Remastered) (reissue) – Double CD/LP – February 21, 2012
MRG426 – The Music Tapes – Purim's Shadows (The Dark Tours the World) – Kazoo and Digital EP – June 14, 2011
MRG427 – Polvo – Heavy Detour b/w Anchoress – 7-inch – July 26, 2011
MRG428 – Crooked Fingers – Breaks in the Armor – CD/LP – October 11, 2011
MRG430 – Stephin Merritt – Obscurities – CD/LP – August 23, 2011
MRG431 – Hospitality – Hospitality – CD/LP – January 31, 2012
MRG432 – Wye Oak – Strangers b/w Mother – 7-inch – November 21, 2011
MRG433 – M. Ward – A Wasteland Companion – CD/LP – April 10, 2012
MRG434 – Lambchop – Mr. M – CD/Double LP – February 21, 2012
MRG435 – Archers of Loaf – All the Nation's Airports (Remastered) (reissue) – Double CD/LP – August 7, 2012
MRG436 – The Love Language – Ruby Red – CD/LP – July 23, 2013
MRG437 – Tracey Thorn – Night Times – Digital EP – November 1, 2011
MRG438 – Tracey Thorn – Extended Plays 2010-2011 – Digital Album – November 8, 2011
MRG439 – The Magnetic Fields – Love at the Bottom of the Sea – CD/LP – March 6, 2012
MRG440 – The Magnetic Fields – Andrew in Drag b/w When Next In Love I Fall – 7-inch – January 31, 2012
MRG441 – The Barren Girls – Hell Hymns – 7-inch – April 2, 2013
MRG442 – Arcade Fire – Sprawl II (Mountains Beyond Mountains) b/w Ready to Start (Remixed By Damain Taylor and Arcade Fire) – 12-inch EP – April 21, 2012
MRG443 – Richard Buckner – Willow b/w Lost – 7-inch – April 21, 2012
MRG444 – Telekinesis – Dormarion – CD/LP – April 2, 2013
MRG445 – Archers of Loaf – White Trash Heroes (Remastered) (reissue) – Double CD/LP – August 7, 2012
MRG446 – The Mountain Goats – Transcendental Youth – CD/LP – October 2, 2012
MRG447 – Eleanor Friedberger – Personal Record – CD/LP – June 4, 2013
MRG448 – M. Ward – Primitive Girl b/w The Twist and Roll Over Beethoven – 7-inch – April 12, 2012
MRG449 – Superchunk – This Summer b/w Last Summer – 7-inch – June 12, 2012
MRG450 – Bob Mould – The Silver Age – CD/LP – September 4, 2012
MRG451 – Sugar – Copper Blue / Beaster (reissue') – Triple CD/Double LP – July 24, 2012
MRG452 – Sugar – Beaster (reissue) – Digital EP – July 24, 2012
MRG453 – Sugar – File Under: Easy Listening (reissue) – Double CD/Double LP – July 24, 2012
MRG454 – Redd Kross – Researching the Blues – CD/LP – August 7, 2012
MRG455 – Divine Fits – A Thing Called Divine Fits – CD/LP – August 28, 2012
MRG456 – Mount Moriah – Mount Moriah – LP – October 2, 2012
MRG457 – Divine Fits – My Love Is Real b/w I Was Born in a Laundromat – 7-inch – July 31, 2012
MRG458 – Various Artists – Merge Records Sampler 2012 – CD – May 29, 2012
MRG459 – Tracey Thorn – Tinsel and Lights – CD/LP – October 30, 2012
MRG460 – Shout Out Louds – Optica – CD/LP – February 26, 2013
MRG461 – Hospitality – Monkey b/w The Drift – 7-inch – October 30, 2012
MRG462 – Mark Eitzel – Don't Be a Stranger – CD/LP – October 2, 2012
MRG463 – Radar Bros. – Eight – LP – January 29, 2013
MRG464 – Coco Hames – Coco Hames – CD/LP – March 31, 2017
MRG465 – William Tyler – Impossible Truth – CD/Double LP – March 19, 2013
MRG466 – Mount Moriah – Miracle Temple – CD/LP – February 26, 2013
MRG467 – Amor de Días – The House at Sea – CD/LP – January 29, 2013
MRG468 – Flock of Dimes – Curtain b/w Apparition – 7-inch – September 25, 2012
MRG469 – The Mountain Goats – Steal Smoked Fish b/w In the Shadow of the Western Hills – 7-inch – October 2, 2012
MRG470 – Reigning Sound – Falling Rain – CD/LP – July 15, 2014
MRG471 – Hospitality – Trouble – CD/LP – January 28, 2014
MRG472 – Future Bible Heroes – Partygoing – CD – June 4, 2013
MRG473 – Future Bible Heroes – Memories of Love, Eternal Youth, and Partygoing. – Quadruple CD/Triple LP – June 4, 2013
MRG474 – She & Him – Volume 3 – CD/LP/Cassette – June 4, 2013
MRG475 – Mikal Cronin – MC II – CD/LP – June 4, 2013
MRG476 – Mount Moriah – Rdio Session – Digital Album – May 28, 2013
MRG477 – Various Artists – Merge Records Sampler Winter 2012 – CD – October 2, 2012
MRG478 – Daphni – Jiaolong – CD/Double LP – October 16, 2012
MRG479 – Superchunk – Me and You and Jackie Mittoo b/w Sunset Arcade – 7-inch – July 23, 2013
MRG480 – Superchunk – I Hate Music – CD/LP – August 20, 2013
MRG481 – The Mountain Goats – All Hail West Texas – CD/LP – June 4, 2013
MRG482 – Telekinesis – Ghosts and Creatures (demo) – flexi 7-inch – April 2, 2013
MRG483 – David Kilgour & the Heavy Eights – Columbus b/w Shifting Sands – 7-inch – June 25, 2013
MRG484 – Arcade Fire – Reflektor – 12-inch – September 9, 2013
MRG485 – Arcade Fire – Reflektor – Double CD/Double LP – October 29, 2013
MRG486 – King Khan & The Shrines – Idle No More – CD/LP – September 3, 2013
MRG488 – Caribou - "Our Love" - CD/LP - October 7, 2014
MRG489 – Tracey Thorn – Joy – Digital Single – December 10, 2012
MRG490 – Superchunk – Void b/w Faith – 7-inch – April 20, 2013
MRG491 – Saint Rich – Beyond the Drone – CD/LP - September 30, 2013
MRG492 – Teenage Fanclub – CD/LP – September 9, 2016
MRG493 – Various Artists – Merge Records 2013 Summer Sampler – CD – July 1, 2013
MRG494 – Vertical Scratchers – Daughter of Everything – CD/LP – February 25, 2014
MRG495 – Ex Hex – Hot and Cold b/w Waterfall and Everywhere – 7-inch – March 18, 2014
MRG496 – Shout Out Louds – Rdio Session – Digital Album – June 25, 2013
MRG497 – Divine Fits – Chained to Love b/w Ain't That the Way – 12-inch – July 23, 2013
MRG498 – Destroyer – Five Spanish Songs – 12-inch/CDEP – November 29, 2013
MRG499 – Richard Buckner – Surrounded – CD/LP - September 3, 2013
MRG500 – Various Artists – Or Thousands of Prizes – CD – December 2014
MRG501 – Mikal Cronin / Superchunk – "Take It Easy" b/w "Good Morning" – 7-inch – December 2014
MRG502 – Mount Moriah / The Mountain Goats – "Revolution Blues" b/w "Shot In The Dark" – 7-inch – December 2014
MRG503 – The Clientele – "Falling Asleep" b/w "Orpheus Avenue" – 7-inch – December 2014
MRG504 – King Khan & The Shrines / Destroyer – "Know Your Product" b/w "Te Recuerdo Amanda" – 7-inch – December 2014
MRG505 – Lambchop / Hospitality – "FA-Q" b/w "Inauguration (Super Timeline Version)" – 7-inch – December 2014
MRG506 – Wye Oak / Telekinesis! – "Better" b/w "Sebastian" – 7-inch – December 2014
MRG507 – Redd Kross / Vertical Scratchers – "Leave It Where You Found It" b/w "Jackie's Favorite" – 7-inch – December 2014
MRG508 – East River Pipe / Reigning Sound – "Did The Bank Boys Fool Ya?" b/w "Falling Rain (Acoustic)" – 7-inch – December 2014
MRG509 – Eleanor Friedberger / Spoon – "Open Your Soul To Me" b/w "Waiting To Know You" – 7-inch – December 2014
MRG510 – Hiss Golden Messenger / Matt Suggs – "Rock Holy" b/w "This Is My Light" – 7-inch – December 2014
MRG511 – Crooked Fingers / Spider Bags – "Western Line" b/w "Into A Tree" – 7-inch – December 2014
MRG512 – Ex Hex / Twerps – "All Kindsa Girls" b/w "Science" – 7-inch – December 2014
MRG513 – Various Artists – Or Thousands of Prizes, The Covers – EP – December 2014
MRG514 – She & Him – The Capitol Studio Sessions – Digital EP – December 2, 2013
MRG515 – Wye Oak – Shriek – CD/LP – April 29, 2014
MRG516 – The Mountain Goats – Beat the Champ – CD/LP – April 7, 2015
MRG517 – The Love Language – Black Mt. Demos – Cassette – July 23, 2013 / Digital Album – October 8, 2013
MRG518 – William Tyler – Lost Colony – 12-inch – April 29, 2014
MRG519 – David Kilgour and the Heavy Eights – End Times Undone – CD/LP – August 5, 2014
MRG520 – Bob Mould – Beauty & Rain – CD/LP – June 3, 2014
MRG521 – Spider Bags – Frozen Letter – CD/LP – August 5, 2014
MRG522 – Flesh Wounds – "Bitter Boy" b/w "Kennel Cough" and "Let Me Be Clear" – 7-inch – May 13, 2014
MRG523 – Hiss Golden Messenger – Lateness of Dancers – CD/LP – September 9, 2014
MRG524 – Various Artists – M-25 Sampler – CD – May 2014
MRG525 – Ex Hex – Rips – CD/LP – October 7, 2014
MRG526 – Hiss Golden Messenger – "Brother, Do You Know The Road" – Digital single – May 14, 2014
MRG527 – Titus Andronicus – The Most Lamentable Tragedy – CD/LP – July 28, 2015
MRG528 – Twerps – Underlay EP – Digital – August 19, 2014
MRG529 – Superchunk & Eleanor Friedberger – "Oh Oh I Love Her So" b/w "Free Money" – 7-inch – July 25, 2014
MRG530 – HeCTA  – The Diet – CD/LP – September 18, 2015
MRG532 – Twerps – Back To You" b/w "Always Waiting" – 7-inch – November 4, 2014
MRG533 – M. Ward – More Rain – CD/LP – March 4, 2016
MRG534 – Lambchop – FLOTUS – CD/LP – November 4, 2016
MRG535 – William Tyler – Deseret Canyon (Reissue) – LP – April 18, 2015
MRG536 – Mount Moriah – How to Dance – CD/LP – February 26, 2016
MRG537 – Little Scream – Cult Following – CD/LP – May 6, 2016
MRG538 – Twerps – Range Anxiety – CD/LP – January 27, 2015
MRG539 – Mike Krol – Turkey – CD/LP – August 28, 2015
MRG540 – Will Butler – Policy – CD/LP – March 10, 2015
MRG542 – Various Artists – Fall Sampler 2014 – CD – September 2014
MRG543 – Hiss Golden Messenger – Southern Grammar – 12-inch – February 3, 2015
MRG544 – Telekinesis – Ad Infinitum – CD/LP – September 18, 2015
MRG545 – William Tyler – Modern Country – CD/LP – June 3, 2016
MRG546 – The Mountain Goats – "Blood Capsules" b/w "Dub Capsules – 12-inch – May 19, 2015
MRG548 – Eric Bachmann – Eric Bachmann – CD/LP – March 25, 2016
MRG549 – Waxahatchee – Ivy Tripp – CD/LP – April 7, 2015
MRG550 – Mikal Cronin – MCIII – CD/LP/Cassette – May 4, 2015
MRG551 – Benji Hughes – "Songs in the Key of Animals" – CD/LP – January 29, 2016 
MRG552 – Various Artists – Spring-Summer Sampler 2015 – CD – April 2015
MRG553 – The Clientele – Alone and Unreal: The Best of the Clientele – LP – September 4, 2015
MRG554 – Mac McCaughan – "Box Batteries" b/w "Whatever Light" – 7-inch – April 7, 2015
MRG555 – Mac McCaughan – Non-Believers – CD/LP – May 4, 2015
MRG556 – Benji Hughes – "Shark Attack" b/w "Mama, I'm a Zombie" – 7-inch – October 9, 2015
MRG557 – Benji Hughes – "Freaky Feedback Blues" b/w "Jazz x 10-inch – 7-inch – October 9, 2015
MRG558 – Various Artists – Fall Sampler 2015 – CD – September 2015
MRG560 – Crooked Fingers – Crooked Fingers (Reissue) – CD/LP – January 29, 2016
MRG561 – Crooked Fingers – Bring On the Snakes (Reissue)  – CD/LP – January 29, 2016
MRG562 – A Giant Dog – Pile – CD/LP – May 6, 2016
MRG564 – Wye Oak – Tween – CD/LP – August 5, 2016
MRG565 – Spoon – Gimmie Fiction (Deluxe Reissue) – CD/LP – December 11, 2015
MRG566 – Mount Moriah – "Calvander" and "Baby Blue (Garage Demo)" b/w "Plane (Live)" – 7-inch – October 9, 2015
MRG567 – King Khan & The Shrines – "Children of the World" b/w "Gone Are the Times" – 7-inch – June 3, 2016
MRG568 – Various Artists – 2016 Spring-Summer Sampler – CD – May 2015
MRG569 – Destroyer – Poison Season – CD/LP – August 28, 2015
MRG570 – Destroyer – "Forces From Above (Remix)" b/w "Times Square, Poison Season" – 12-inch – August 28, 2015
MRG571 – Destroyer – "My Mystery" b/w "My Mystery (DJ johnedwardcollins@gmail.com remix)"  – 7-inch – May 6, 2016
MRG572 – Titus Andronicus – S+@dium Rock – LP – July 29, 2016
MRG573 – Waxahatchee – Early Recordings – Cassette – June 17, 2016
MRG574 – Will Butler – Friday Night – CD/LP – June 17, 2016
MRG575 – Hiss Golden Messenger – Heart Like a Levee – CD/LP – October 7, 2016
MRG577 – Sneaks – Gymnastics (Reissue) – CD/LP – September 9, 2016
MRG578 – Sneaks – It's A Myth – CD – March 31, 2017
MRG579 – The Mountain Goats – Goths – CD – Release Date May 19, 2017
MRG580 – Bob Mould – Patch The Sky – CD/LP – March 25, 2016
MRG581 – Bob Mould – Live from Studio X – CD – April 16, 2016
MRG582 – Mark Eitzel – Hey Mr Ferryman – CD/LP – January 27, 2017
MRG584 – Allison Crutchfield – Tourist in This Town – CD/LP/Cassette – January 27, 2017
MRG585 – Ibibio Sound Machine – Uyai – CD/LP – March 3, 2017
MRG587 – Various Artists – Fall Sampler 2016 – CD – September 2016
MRG588 – Hollie Cook – Vessel of Love – CD/LP – January 26, 2018
MRG589 – Mike Krol – Mike Krol Is Never Dead: The First Two Records – 2×LP/CD – July 14, 2017
MRG590 – Hollie Cook – "Superstar" – 7-inch – April 22, 2017
MRG592 – A Giant Dog – Toy – CD/LP – August 25, 2017
MRG593 – The Music Tapes – The Orbiting Human Circus – MP3 – February 10, 2017
MRG594 – Waxahatchee – Out In The Storm – CD/LP – July 14, 2017
MRG595 – Spoon – Ga Ga Ga Ga Ga (10th Anniversary) – 2×LP – October 20, 2017
MRG596 – The Love Language – Baby Grand – CD/LP – August 3, 2018
MRG598 – Waxahatchee – Out In The Storm Demos – LP – July 14, 2017
MRG599 – Destroyer – ken – CD/LP – October 20, 2017
MRG600 – Superchunk – "I Got Cut" b/w "Up Against the Wall" – 7-inch – June 2, 2017
MRG601 – Various Artists – 2017 Spring Sampler – CD – April 2017
MRG602 – H.C. McEntire – Lionheart – CD/LP – January 26, 2018
MRG603 – Superchunk – "Break The Glass" b/w "Mad World" – 7-inch – October 17, 2017
MRG604 – Hiss Golden Messenger – "Standing in the Doorway" – Digital single – June 30, 2017
MRG605 – Hiss Golden Messenger – Hallelujah Anyhow – CD/LP – September 22, 2017
MRG606 – Titus Andronicus – A Productive Cough – CD/LP – March 2, 2018
MRG607 – The Clientele – Music For The Age Of Miracles – CD/LP – September 22, 2017
MRG608 – Ought – Room Inside The World – CD/LP – February 16, 2018
MRG610 – Shout Out Louds – Ease My Mind – CD/LP – September 22, 2017
MRG612 – Destroyer – "A Light Travels Down The Catwalk (Acoustic)" b/w "Stay Lost (Acoustic)" – 7-inch – October 20, 2017
MRG613 – Escape-Ism – Introduction To Escape-Ism – CD/LP – November 10, 2017
MRG614 – Wye Oak – "Spiral" b/w "Wave Is Not The Water" – 7-inch – September 22, 2017
MRG615 – Wye Oak – The Louder I Call, The Faster It Runs – CD/LP – April 6, 2018
MRG616 – Shout Out Louds – "Angel" – Flexi – September 22, 2017
MRG617 – Various Artists – I Only Listen To The Mountain Goats: All Hail West Texas – LP – April 6, 2018
MRG618 – Various Artists – 2017 Fall Sampler – CD – September 2017
MRG619 – Tracey Thorn – Record – CD/LP – March 2, 2018
MRG620 – Superchunk – What A Time To Be Alive – CD/LP – February 16, 2018
MRG621 – Spider Bags – Someday Everything Will Be Fine – CD/LP – August 3, 2018
MRG627 – Tracyanne & Danny – Tracyanne & Danny – CD/LP – May 25, 2018
MRG628 – Eric Bachmann – No Recover – CD/LP – September 7, 2018
MRG629 - Apex Manor - Heartbreak City - Peak Vinyl/CD - May 31, 2019
MRG630 – The Rock*A*Teens – Sixth House – CD/LP – June 29, 2018
MRG631 – Superchunk – "What A Time To Be Alive (Acoustic)" b/w "Erasure (Acoustic)" – 7-inch – April 21, 2018
MRG632 – Mt. Wilson Repeater – V'Ger – Digital single – January 23, 2018
MRG633 – The Essex Green – Hardly Electronic – CD/LP – June 29, 2018
MRG636 - Martin Frawley - Undone at 31 - CD/LP - February 22, 2019
MRG639 – Escape-ism – The Lost Record – CD/LP – September 7, 2018
MRG641 - Various Artists - A Merge Group Plays "Heroes" - LP - February 8, 2019 
MRG643 - A Giant Dog - Neon Bible - LP - September 19, 2019
MRG644 - Various Artists - You Wish: A Merge Records Holiday Album - LP - November 22, 2019
MRG651 – Waxahatchee – Great Thunder – CD/EP – September 7, 2018
MRG653 – Various Artists – Spring Sampler 2018 – CD – April 2018
MRG657 – Superchunk / Wye Oak – "Break The Glass (Acoustic)" b/w "The Louder I Call, The Faster It Runs (Acoustic)" – 7-inch – July 2, 2018
MRG659 – Ought – Four Desires – EP – August 21, 2018
MRG660 - Ex Hex - It's Real - LP/CD - March 22, 2019
MRG669 – Mike Krol – "An Ambulance" b/w "Never Know" – 7-inch – August 3, 2018
MRG679 – The Mountain Goats – In League with Dragons – CD/LP – April 26, 2019
MRG700 - Mikal Cronin - Seeker - LP/CD - October 25, 2019
MRG708 - Caribou - Suddenly - CD/LP - February 28, 2020
MRG709 - Destroyer - Have We Met - LP/CD - January 31, 2020
MRG711 - Mikal Cronin - Switched-On Seeker - LP - June 30, 2020
MRG716 - The Mountain Goats - Getting Into Knives - Peak Vinyl/Double LP/CD/Cassette - October 23, 2020
MRG719 - Apex Manor - Blueprints - EP - September 6, 2019
MRG720 - Will Butler - Generations - Peak Vinyl/LP/CD - September 25, 2020
MRG 721 - Sneaks - Happy Birthday - LP/CD - August 21, 2020
MRG722 - H. C. McEntire - “Eno Axis” - Peak Vinyl/LP/CD - August 21, 2020
MRG723 - Cable Ties - Far Enough - Peak Vinyl/LP/CD - March 27, 2020
MRG724 - Archers of Loaf - "Raleigh Days" b/w "Street Fighting Man" - 7-inch - April 18, 2020
MRG725 - Archers of Loaf - "Talking Over Talk" b/w "Cruel Reminder" - 7-inch - June 26, 2020
MRG727 - Wye Oak - No Horizon EP - FLAC - July 31, 2020
MRG730 - Bob Mould - Blue Hearts - LP/CD - September 25, 2020
MRG734 - Redd Kross - Redd Cross - 12”/CD - June 26, 2020
MRG735 - William Tyler - Music from First Cow - LP - July 31, 2020
MRG740 - Lambchop - TRIP - Peak Vinyl/LP/CD - November 13, 2020
MRG742 - Teenage Fanclub - Endless Arcade - LP - April 30, 2021
MRG748 - Caribou - Never Come Back (Four Tet Remix) b/w Never Come Back (Morgan Geist Remix) - 12-inch - July 31, 2020
MRG749 - Caribou - Never Come Back (Floating Points Remix) b/w Sister (Floating Points Remix) - 12-inch - July 31, 2020
MRG758 - Caribou - Suddenly Remixes - 12-inch EP - October 22, 2020
MRG762 - Superchunk - “There’s A Ghost”  b/w “Alice” - FLAC - October 30, 2020
MRG763 - Hiss Golden Messenger - School Daze: A fundraiser for Durham Public Schools students - FLAC - October 9, 2020
MRG771 - Various Artists - “Going to Georgia” - FLAC - December 4, 2020

20th anniversary compilation
SCORE! 20 Years of Merge Records: The Covers! (MRG351) is a compilation album of cover versions of songs written by Merge artists who span the label's existence, and performed by artists not signed to the label.

Twenty covers are included, performed by Quasi, Les Savy Fav, The Shins, St. Vincent/The National, Broken Social Scene, Ryan Adams, Bright Eyes, Lavender Diamond, The Apples in Stereo, Laura Cantrell, Bill Callahan, Barbara Manning, The Mountain Goats, The New Pornographers, Tracey Thorn/Jens Lekman, The Hive Dwellers, Ted Leo and the Pharmacists, Okkervil River, Death Cab for Cutie, and Times New Viking. All proceeds from the compilation of covers were given to charity.

References

Discographies of American record labels
Discography